Günther Rennert (1 April 1911 – 31 July 1978) was a German opera director and administrator.

Rennert was born in Essen, Rhine Province. Starting as a film director in 1933, he then became involved in the operatic theatre, becoming an assistant to Walter Felsenstein at the Opera of Frankfurt (Oder). Subsequently, he worked in Königsberg (1939), Berlin (1942), Munich (1945), Hamburg (1946), Glyndebourne (1959) and many other opera houses. He died in Salzburg, Austria.

Bibliography 
 

1911 births
1978 deaths
German theatre directors
German opera directors
People from Essen
Commanders Crosses of the Order of Merit of the Federal Republic of Germany